A honeycomb is a mass of hexagonal wax cells built by honeybees in their beehives.

Honeycomb may also refer to:

Food 
 Honeycomb (cereal)
 Honeycomb toffee

Music
 Honeycomb (album), by Frank Black
 "Honeycomb" (song), written by Bob Merrill and popularized by Jimmie Rodgers
 "Honeycomb" / "Gotham", a single by Animal Collective
 The Honeycombs, an English 1960s pop group

Science
 Honeycombing, a lung disorder
 Reticulum (anatomy) or honeycomb, part of the alimentary canal of a ruminant animal
 The honeycomb conjecture, in geometry
 Honeycomb (geometry), a space-filling tessellation
 Honeycomb lattice, a 2-dimensional hexagonal lattice
 Honeycomb mirror, used in astronomical telescopes

Other uses 
 Honeycomb (1969 film), a Spanish drama film
 Honeycomb (2022 film), a Canadian horror film
 Android Honeycomb, the codename for versions 3.0–3.2 of the Android operating system
 Honeycomb ground, a type of bobbin lace mesh
 Honeycomb structure, natural or man-made structures that have the geometry of a honeycomb
 The Honeycombs (Oregon), rock formations in Malheur County
 Project Honeycomb, a Sun Microsystems object-oriented storage system
 Android Honeycomb, the eighth version of Android
 Honeycomb, an observability software service